The Day of Reckoning by Jude Watson is the eighth in a series of young reader novels called Jedi Apprentice. The series explores the adventures of Qui-Gon Jinn and Obi-Wan Kenobi prior to Star Wars: Episode I – The Phantom Menace.

Plot
Qui-Gon Jinn and Obi-Wan Kenobi go to the planet of Telos on an unofficial mission to apprehend Xanatos, the Dark Jedi who had tried to destroy the Jedi Temple. Upon their arrival, they are surprised to find that Xanatos wields significant financial and political power on Telos. They soon discover that Xanatos and the government of Telos have been distracting the populace with a new form of gambling called Katharsis. In the meantime, the company UniFy, a subsidiary of the massive Offworld Corporation headed by Xanatos, has been mining the planet's resources despite the importance the native Telosians place on their environment.

Pursued by Xanatos' men, Obi-Wan and Qui-Gon are forced to trust Denetrus ("Den"), a con man associated with POWER, an outlawed political party dedicated to preserving the Telosian environment. The three infiltrate the UniFy headquarters, looking for evidence to prove that Offworld is mishandling the planet's resources. However, the two Jedi are arrested, and Xanatos personally informs them they have been sentenced to death. The Jedi manage to escape the public execution with the help of Andra, a member of the POWER party.

Obi-Wan and Andra infiltrate the Sacred Pools of Telos and discover that the site is indeed being used for mining operations. The two are detected by surveillance droids, but are able to escape and record evidence that Offworld is connected with UniFy. Meanwhile, Den and Qui-Gon have rigged the Katharsis lottery so that Den will win. When Den does win and Xanatos presents the prize to him, the recorded images are played for all the Telosians to see. However, Xanatos deceives the crowd and the Jedi are captured once more. But Den, addressing the crowd, tells the people how the lottery was rigged and how the Telosians were robbed of their money. Xanatos then makes his get-away, but Qui-Gon and Obi-Wan chase him back to the Sacred Pools site. After a lightsaber battle amid the black acid pools, the two Jedi finally corner the Dark Jedi. But Xanatos, not willing to be defeated, commits suicide by throwing himself into the acid pools.

External links

Amazon.com Listing
Official CargoBay Listing
TheForce.net review

2000 British novels
2000 science fiction novels
Star Wars: Jedi Apprentice
Star Wars Legends novels
English novels